The Society of German Natural Scientists and Physicians (GDNÄ) is the oldest scientific association in Germany. It was founded in 1822 by the German naturalist Lorenz Oken. Carl Gustav Carus, Albert Einstein, Fritz Haber, Hermann von Helmholtz, Alexander von Humboldt, and Max Planck were all closely associated with the society and helped shape its development. The society currently has about 2,500 members. It hosts a meeting every two years in which developments in science and medicine are discussed.

References

External links

 Official website

Scientific societies based in Germany
Organizations established in 1822